Ponckhockie Union Chapel is a historic chapel at 91 Abruyn Street in Kingston, New York. It was built in 1870, and is a rectangular, Gothic Revival style poured reinforced concrete structure coated in stucco.  It is three bays wide and five bays deep, and features a projecting bell tower topped by a truncated spire.

It was added to the National Register of Historic Places in 1980.

References

External links
National Park Service: Ponckhockie Union Congregational Church

Properties of religious function on the National Register of Historic Places in New York (state)
Gothic Revival church buildings in New York (state)
Churches completed in 1870
19th-century churches in the United States
Churches in Ulster County, New York
National Register of Historic Places in Ulster County, New York